Gossys Reef is a small granite island, with an area of 1.5 ha, in south-eastern Australia.  It is part of Tasmania’s Sentinel Island Group, lying in eastern Bass Strait off the north-west coast of Flinders Island in the Furneaux Group.

Fauna
Seabirds and waders recorded as breeding on the island include silver gull, Caspian tern and sooty oystercatcher.  The metallic skink is also present.

References

Furneaux Group